Joaquín Zavala Solís (30 November 1835 in Managua – 30 December 1906 in Managua) was the President of Nicaragua from 1 March 1879 to 1 March 1883 and from 16 July to 15 September 1893. He was a member of the Conservative Party of Nicaragua.

He is now remembered especially for having thwarted the request of the young Rubén Darío, later to become one of the most well-known Spanish-language poets, for a government scholarship to study in Europe. In 1882 Darío, then 15 years old, read some of his poetry to a group including the President - whereupon Zavala reportedly reproved him: "My son, if you so write against the religion of your fathers and their homeland now, what will become of you if you go to Europe and learn worse things?"

References

1835 births
1906 deaths
People from Managua
Presidents of Nicaragua
Conservative Party (Nicaragua) politicians
19th-century Nicaraguan people